Mago may refer to:

Places
Mago Island, an island in Fiji
Mago, Minorca, a Carthaginian and later Roman town in Menorca
Mago, Russia, a rural locality (a settlement) in Khabarovsk Krai, Russia
Mago National Park, in Ethiopia
Mount Mago a mountain in Mago National Park, Ethiopia
Mago River a tributary of the Omo river in Mago National Park, Ethiopia

People
 Mago (agricultural writer), Carthaginian writer quoted and drawn on by Columella
 Mago Barca (243–203 BCE), Carthaginian general, son of Hamilcar Barca and brother of Hannibal
 Mago (fleet commander) (died 383 BCE), Carthaginian fleet commander, active in Sicily
 Mago (general), Carthaginian general active in Sicily in the mid 4th century BCE
 The Magonids of the ruling dynasty of Carthage from 550 BCE to 340 BCE
 Mago I of Carthage (reigned c. 550 – c. 530 BCE)
 Mago II of Carthage (reigned 396–375 BCE)
 Mago III of Carthage (reigned 375–344 BCE)
 Andrea Bargnani known as "Il Mago" (b. 1985), Italian basketball player
 Francisco Mago Leccia (1931–2004), Venezuelan ichthyologist
 Hannibal Mago (died 406 BCE), Carthaginian shofet and general
 Kenryo Hayashi, also known as "Mago", professional fighting game player

Music
 Mago, an alternative term for didgeridoo 
 Mago (album), a 2007 album by Billy Martin and John Medeski
 Mägo de Oz, a Celtic folk metal band from Spain
 "Mago", a 2020 single by GFriend from the album 回:Walpurgis Night

Other uses
 Mago (spider), a spider genus of the family Salticidae found in South America
 HD 32518, a star with the approved name "Mago", named after the Mago National Park
 Magu or Mago, a Chinese and Korean goddess
 Nurarihyon no Mago, a manga series

See also
 Magus (disambiguation)